Local elections were held in Malabon on May 13, 2019 as part of the Philippine general election. Several local posts in the city were on the ballot, including the mayor, vice mayor, the two Congressmen, and the twelve councilors for the city's two Sangguniang Panglungsod districts (six for each district).

Background 
Incumbent Mayor Antolin Oreta III sought his third and final term. He was challenged by Vice Mayor Jeannie Ng-Sandoval.

Incumbent Vice Mayor Jeannie Ng-Sandoval was on her second term. She ran as Mayor instead. Her party selected the incumbent First District Councilor Maricar Torres, who faced incumbent First District Councilor Bernard "Ninong" Dela Cruz, Mayor Oreta's running mate.

Incumbent Representative Federico "Ricky" Sandoval II, husband of mayoral candidate Jeannie Ng-Sandoval sought a second term. He faced former Rep. Josephine Veronique "Jaye" Lacson-Noel, who lost to Oreta last election.

Results

Mayor

Vice Mayor

Representative, Lone District

Councilors

First District 

|-
| colspan="5" style="background:black;"|

Second District 

|-
| colspan="5" style="background:black;"|

References 

 #PHVote 2019: Local races for MALABON CITY, Phrappler.com
 Certified List of Candidates : NATIONAL CAPITAL REGION - THIRD DISTRICT, Comelec.gov.ph
 List of local candidates 2019: Malabon City, Philstar.com

Malabon
Elections in Malabon
May 2019 events in the Philippines
2019 elections in Metro Manila